Galician Literature Day is a public holiday observed in Galicia, Spain. It is a celebration of the Galician language and its literature which was inaugurated by the Royal Galician Academy (Real Academia Galega) in 1963. This celebration has taken place on May 17 each year since 1963. In the year 1991 Galician Literature Day was declared a public holiday in all Galicia.

The first celebration took place in 1963 to commemorate the centenary of Cantares gallegos, the first work written in the Galician language by Rosalía de Castro (1837–1885), who later became one of the most important poets in the history of Galicia. Cantares gallegos was first published on May 17, 1863.

Since 1963, each Galician Literature Day has been dedicated to a different writer in the Galician language. Only writers who have been dead for at least ten years are eligible, and the choice is made by the Royal Galician Academy. There is only one precedent of a "shared" Day: in 1998, the day was dedicated to Martín Codax, Xohán de Cangas and Mendinho, together with the authors of the medieval songs (cantigas).

List of authors honoured on Galician Literature Day
These are the authors who have been honored on Galician Literature Day:

References

External links

Real Academia Galega 

May observances
Language observances
Galician culture
Annual events in Galicia (Spain)
Public holidays in Spain